Scarborough Londesborough Road railway station, originally called Washbeck Excursion Station, was built as an excursion station to ease operating pressure at Scarborough Central in the holiday resort of Scarborough. It had a through and a bay platform. Excursion trains from all over the country could be routed into it rather than the main Central station to disembark their passengers before heading onwards to the  branch line to be stabled in carriage sidings at Northstead/Gallows Close on the town's northern outskirts. Return services would follow the same route in the opposite direction to load up before departure.

It was opened on 8 June 1908 by the North Eastern Railway, but it was not advertised in public timetables until 1933, after it had been upgraded to a public station. It was closed to passenger trains by British Railways on 25 August 1963, but remained in use for stabling coaching stock until its official closure on 4 July 1966.

The station building and the remains of the 14 coach long platform can still be seen from trains on the Yorkshire Coast Line and on the York to Scarborough section of the North TransPennine route on the west side of the tracks approaching . However, most of the platform has been demolished due to the construction of a new service depot for TransPennine Express trains.

References

External links
 Scarborough Londesborough Road station (lower left) on navigable 1947 O. S. map 

Disused railway stations in Scarborough, North Yorkshire
Former North Eastern Railway (UK) stations
Railway stations in Great Britain opened in 1908
Railway stations in Great Britain closed in 1963
Hull to Scarborough Line
Stations on the Hull to Scarborough line
1908 establishments in England